The World Intellectual Property Organization (WIPO) is one of the 16 specialized agencies of the United Nations.

WIPO currently has 193 member states. 190 of the UN Members as well as the Holy See, Niue and the Cook Islands are Members of WIPO. Non-members are the states of Kosovo, Federated States of Micronesia, Palau, South Sudan, and the states with limited recognition. Palestine has observer status.

History 
 27 March 2000: Dominican Republic joins
 2 March 2012: Vanuatu joins
 11/12 December 2017: East Timor and the Marshall Islands join
 4 July 2019: Solomon Islands join
 11 May 2020 Nauru joins

References 

World Intellectual Property Organization
WIPO